"Wordplay" is the first segment of the second episode of the first season (1985–86) of the television series The Twilight Zone. An allegorical tale around the themes of language barriers and adulthood learning, it follows a man who finds that suddenly everyone around him has swapped the meanings of unrelated words.

Plot
Bill Lowery is a salesman whose company has switched to a medical supply product line. He stays up late at night attempting to memorize medical terms in order to be familiar with the products in a week's time. As Bill leaves for work, his neighbor refers to his dog as an "encyclopedia". Bill shrugs it off, thinking his neighbor is joking. Bill puts in a full morning of work trying to cope with new terms, which include jibes from younger salesmen such as "teaching old dogs new 'trumpets'." A subordinate asks him about a good place to go for "dinosaur." Bill tries to find out why the co-worker is not using the correct word, but the co-worker walks away annoyed.

Bill goes home for lunch. His wife Kathy says their son is feeling ill, and didn't eat his "dinosaur". This makes Bill realize the bizarre neologisms he has been hearing are not just a practical joke.

Returning to the office, Bill finds that the word swaps appear even in printed form, such as his personnel file and car displays, and that the amount of gibberish has increased to the point where he can no longer understand anything that is said to him. He goes back home to find his son suffering from a very high fever. Bill picks up the boy and takes him to the emergency room, where Kathy has to handle everything because Bill cannot make himself understood. A doctor comes out of his son's room after some time to tell Bill and Kathy that their son is okay.

That night, following a quiet but content meal with Kathy, Bill sits down in his son's bedroom and picks up one of his ABC books. He uses it to begin studying the vocabulary of the language that he now needs to re-learn.

Production
"Wordplay" was an unsolicited script by Rockne S. O'Bannon. The Twilight Zones producers were so impressed by the script (which underwent almost no changes between O'Bannon's submission and the episode's filming) that they hired O'Bannon as a staff writer and story editor for the show. O'Bannon would contribute another seven scripts over the run of the series.

See also
 Aphasia

References

External links
 

1985 American television episodes
The Twilight Zone (1985 TV series season 1) episodes

fr:Jeu de mots (La Cinquième Dimension)